is a Japanese former professional baseball player who spent his entire 19-year career with Nippon Professional Baseball's Yomiuri Giants, serving as the team's captain from 2007 to 2014. He has twice been named the MVP of the Nippon Professional Baseball All-Star Series, in 2007 (Game 1) and 2010 (Game 1).

Career
In the 2009 Japan Series, won by Abe's Giants 4 games to 2 over the Hokkaido Nippon-Ham Fighters, he was named the Most Valuable Player.

In 2012, after hitting .340 with 27 home runs and 104 RBIs, Abe was named the Central League Most Valuable Player. In addition, Abe was the co-recipient (along with teammate Tatsunori Hara) of the 2012 Matsutaro Shoriki Award.

He was the captain of Japanese national team in 2013 WBC, and hit 2 home runs in the same inning against the Netherlands, becoming the first and only player to achieve such a feat in the history of the WBC.

With 406 career home runs, Abe ranks 18th on the NPB career list.

On September 24, 2019, Abe announced he would retire after the 2019 season, his 19th in NPB.

Abe was named the manager of the Giants' second squad for the 2020 season.

International career
He was selected Japan national baseball team at the 1997 Intercontinental Cup, 1999 Asian Baseball Championship, 2000 Summer Olympics, 2007 Asian Baseball Championship, 2008 Summer Olympics, 2009 World Baseball Classic, 2012 exhibition games against Cuba and 2013 World Baseball Classic.

Also, he was selected Nippon Professional Baseball All-Stars at the 2004 MLB Japan All-Star Series  and the 2006 MLB Japan All-Star Series. On November 16, 2018, he was selected Yomiuri Giants roster at the 2018 MLB Japan All-Star Series exhibition game against MLB All-Stars.

References

External links

 Career statistics - NPB.jp 
Japan Baseball Daily

1979 births
Asian Games medalists in baseball
Asian Games silver medalists for Japan
Baseball players at the 1998 Asian Games
Baseball players at the 2000 Summer Olympics
Baseball players at the 2008 Summer Olympics
Baseball people from Chiba Prefecture
Chuo University alumni
Living people
Medalists at the 1998 Asian Games
Nippon Professional Baseball catchers
Nippon Professional Baseball first basemen
Nippon Professional Baseball MVP Award winners
Olympic baseball players of Japan
People from Urayasu, Chiba
Yomiuri Giants players
2009 World Baseball Classic players
2013 World Baseball Classic players